Royal Eagle is a 1936 British crime film directed by George A. Cooper and starring John Garrick, Nancy Burne, Felix Aylmer and Edmund Willard. The screenplay was written by Arnold Ridley.

Cast
 John Garrick - Jim Hornby 
 Nancy Burne - Sally Marshall 
 Felix Aylmer - Windridge 
 Edmund Willard - Burnock 
 Lawrence Anderson - Vale 
 Hugh E. Wright - Albert Marshall 
 Muriel Aked - Miss Mimm 
 Fred Groves - Sam Waldock 
 Betty Shale - Mrs Marshall

References

External links

1936 films
1936 crime films
Films directed by George A. Cooper
British black-and-white films
British crime films
Films shot at British International Pictures Studios
1930s English-language films
1930s British films